Prilly-Malley railway station is a railway station in the municipality of Prilly (in the western suburbs of Lausanne), in the Swiss canton of Vaud. It is an intermediate stop on multiple standard gauge lines of Swiss Federal Railways.

The station opened on June 29, 2012. The canton and the federal government split the construction cost of 65 million francs.

Services 
 the following services stop at Prilly-Malley:

 RER Vaud:

References

External links 
 
 

Railway stations in the canton of Vaud
Swiss Federal Railways stations
Railway stations in Switzerland opened in 2012